GW–Shimano–Sidermec is a Colombian-registered UCI Continental cycling team that participates in road bicycle racing events on the UCI Continental Circuits. Prior to 2023, the team was based in Italy and held UCI ProTeam status.  manages the team, with assistance from directeurs sportifs Giovanni Ellena, Antonio Castano, Didier Paindaveine and Marco Bellini.

In 2022, with the arrival of a new sponsor — Drone Hopper (an aeronautical engineering company based in Spain) — the team has received a new name Drone Hopper–Androni Giocattoli.

Doping
On 5 June 2014 Patrick Facchini gave an adverse analytical finding for Tuaminoheptane and was consequently banned for 10 months.

On 30 June 2015 Davide Appollonio gave an adverse analytical finding for EPO and was provisionally suspended. On 27 July 2015 Fabio Taborre gave a positive test result for the banned blood-booster FG-4592 in an out-of-competition control on 16 June. The team were automatically suspended by the UCI under new rules. FG-4592 (Roxadustat) is in phase 3 clinical trials and has not yet been commercialised. The drug was developed jointly by FibroGen and AstraZeneca. Unlike EPO, which directly stimulates the production of red blood cells, FG-4592 is taken orally, and stimulates natural production of EPO in a manner similar to altitude training. This class of compounds has been outlawed by WADA. The UCI subsequently suspended the team for 30 days.

Team roster

Major wins

National champions

2000
 Colombia Time Trial, Israel Ochoa
2001
 Australia Time Trial, Kristjan Snorrasson
2002
 Colombia Road Race, Jhon García
2005
 Colombia Time Trial, Iván Parra
2009
 Switzerland Time Trial, Rubens Bertogliati
2010
 Switzerland Time Trial, Rubens Bertogliati
2012
 Italy Road Race, Franco Pellizotti
 Venezuela Road Race, Miguel Ubeto
 Venezuela Time Trial, Tomás Gil
2014
 Venezuela U23 Time Trial, Yonder Godoy
2015
 Venezuela Time Trial, Yonder Godoy
 Romania Time Trial, Serghei Țvetcov
 Romania Road Race, Serghei Țvetcov
2019
 Croatia Time Trial, Josip Rumac
 Croatia Road Race, Josip Rumac
2020
 Croatia Time Trial, Josip Rumac
 Croatia Road Race, Josip Rumac
2021
 Ecuador Road Race, Jefferson Alexander Cepeda
 Ukraine Road Race, Andrii Ponomar

References

External links
  

 
UCI Professional Continental teams
Cycling teams established in 1996
Cycling teams based in Italy